Anthony Maniscalco, better known by his stage name Hook n Sling, is an Australian record producer, songwriter and DJ currently residing in Los Angeles, California.

Musical career
In 2007, he received an ARIA Music Awards nomination, a DMC Buzz Chart #1 and several Pete Tong plays for his breakout tune "The Bump", and later achieved both club and of sound have had Hook ilations including the prestigious Ministry of Sound Annual in 2010. Hook n Sling has played at venues and festivals across the world including Pacha, Space Ibiza, Global Gathering, Future Music Festival and Stereosonic.

In 2011, he toured the United States and played with Wolfgang Gartner at the infamous Music Box in Los Angeles. He also claimed a Hype Machine number one with the track "Take You Higher" with Goodwill.

In February 2012, he set off on an extensive tour across the United States, Dominican Republic and Canada.

In 2014, his single "Tokyo by Night" was released with a remix from Swedish DJ Axwell, on his label Axtone. The remix was premiered on 18 April 2014 and gained BBC Radio 1 support from Danny Howard. It topped the Beatport charts the week after its release.

In 2019, he remixed a famous track by Robin Schulz featuring Harlœ titled "All This Love"

Hook n Sling is published by Kobalt for the world, and managed by Dave Frank and Lucas Keller at Milk & Honey.

Discography

Extended plays

Singles

Music videos

Remixes

Mix compilations
 2008 Clubbers Guide Ministry of Sound
 2009 Progression 2 (Ministry of Sound)
 2010 Clubbers Guide Ministry of Sound
 2011 The Annual Ministry of Sound

Awards and nominations

ARIA Music Awards
The ARIA Music Awards is an annual awards ceremony that recognises excellence, innovation, and achievement across all genres of Australian music..

|-
| 2007 || "The Bump" (with Kid Kenobi) || ARIA Award for Best Dance Release || 
|-

References

External links

Hook n Sling Official Website
360 Agency 
Beatport - Hook n Sling

Year of birth missing (living people)
Living people
DJs from Sydney
Musicians from Sydney
House musicians
Australian house musicians
Australian DJs
Electronic dance music DJs